The Grand Budapest Hotel is a 2014 comedy-drama film written and directed by Wes Anderson. Ralph Fiennes leads a seventeen-actor ensemble cast as Monsieur Gustave H., famed concierge of a twentieth-century mountainside resort in the fictional Eastern European country of Zubrowka. When Gustave is framed for the murder of a wealthy dowager (Tilda Swinton), he and his recently befriended protégé Zero (Tony Revolori) embark on a quest for fortune and a priceless Renaissance painting amidst the backdrop of an encroaching fascist regime. Anderson's American Empirical Pictures produced the film in association with Studio Babelsberg, Fox Searchlight Pictures, and Indian Paintbrush's Scott Rudin and Steven Rales. Fox Searchlight supervised the commercial distribution, and The Grand Budapest Hotels funding was sourced through Indian Paintbrush and German government-funded tax rebates.

Anderson and longtime collaborator Hugo Guinness conceived The Grand Budapest Hotel as a fragmented tale following a character inspired by a common friend. They initially struggled in their brainstorming, but the experience touring Europe and researching the literature of Austrian novelist Stefan Zweig shaped their vision for the film. The Grand Budapest Hotel draws visually from Europe-set mid-century Hollywood films and the United States Library of Congress's photochrom print collection of alpine resorts. Filming took place in eastern Germany from January to March 2013. French composer Alexandre Desplat composed the symphonic, Russian folk-inspired score, which expanded on his early work with Anderson. The film explores themes of fascism, nostalgia, friendship, and loyalty, and further studies analyze the function of color as an important storytelling device.

The Grand Budapest Hotel premiered in competition at the 64th Berlin International Film Festival on February 6, 2014. The French theatrical release on February 26 preceded the film's global rollout, followed by releases in Germany, North America, and the United Kingdom on March 6–7. The Grand Budapest Hotel received highly positive reviews in the press. Critics distinguished the actors and the film's craftsmanship for praise, though occasional criticism centered on the film's approach to subject matter, fragmented storytelling, and characterization. It earned $173 million in box office revenue worldwide, Anderson's highest-grossing feature to date. The film was nominated for nine awards at the 87th Academy Awards, winning four, and received numerous other accolades.

Plot
In a cemetery in the former nation of Zubrowka, a young woman visits the shrine of a renowned writer, known simply as "Author", reading his most-cherished book: The Grand Budapest Hotel. The book, written in 1985, recounts his 1968 vacation at the once-grand, then-drab hotel. There, he meets its owner, Zero Moustafa, who at dinner tells his rags to riches story.

In 1932, Zero is the newly hired lobby boy at the prestigious Grand Budapest Hotel. Monsieur Gustave H., the hotel's fastidious concierge, seduces old, wealthy clients, including the 84-year-old dowager Madame D., with whom he has had a nearly two-decade affair. She mysteriously dies a month after her last hotel visit. Gustave and Zero visit Madame's Schloss Lutz estate, where they encounter surviving relatives for the reading of her will by her attorney Deputy Vilmos Kovacs. Kovacs announces a recent codicil to the will which bequeaths Boy with Apple, a priceless Renaissance painting, to Gustave. Madame D.'s son, Dmitri, is outraged and demands Gustave's arrest. Gustave and Zero leave, absconding with the painting, hiding it within the Grand Budapest.

Gustave is later arrested by Inspector Henckels under the suspicion of Madame D.'s murder. He befriends a gang during his imprisonment and provides them with pastry from Mendl's, a well known bakery. One day, one of Gustave's cellmates, Ludwig, tells Gustave and the rest of the prisoners about his deep knowledge of the prison and how to exploit its weaknesses to escape, namely via a storm-drain sewage system. Gustave is then convinced to join the prison break. Gustave has Zero place hammers, chisels and sawblades inside pastries made by Agatha, an apprentice baker at Mendl's and Zero's fiancée. Because the pastries from Mendl’s are well-known works of art, the guard who is in charge of checking outside foods for contraband is unable to bring himself to break open the pastries to check for content, enabling the pastries to pass through security check.

During the process of escaping, Gustave and the convicts stumble upon a group of guards secretly gambling during the night. Günther, one of the escape party, is able to kill them all with a shiv but loses his life in the process. In the end, the rest of the group manages to escape and disperse. When Zero and Gustave are reunited, they set out to prove Gustave's innocence with the assistance of a fraternity of concierges known as 'the Society of the Crossed Keys'. They learn that Madame D. had a missing second will which would only take effect should she be murdered. Dmitri's hired assassin J. G. Jopling trails their whereabouts, murdering Kovacs, Madame D.'s butler Serge X, and Serge X's sister in his pursuit to kill Gustave. Following a chase, Zero pushes Jopling off a cliff to save Gustave, and the two men continue their escape from swarming Zubrowkan troops led by Henckels.

Gustave, Zero, and Agatha arrive back at the Grand Budapest to find it converted into a military headquarters following the outbreak of war. Agatha sneaks in to retrieve Boy with Apple, but is spotted with the painting by Dmitri. Gustave and Zero rush to save Agatha from harm as she flees from Dmitri. He shoots at them and initiates a melee with Zubrowkan troops, which Henckels stops. Agatha's attempt to escape leaves her and Zero hanging from a balcony before safely falling into the van of pastries in which they came.

Madame D.'s second will, making Gustave the beneficiary of her fortune, is found attached to the back of Boy with Apple; he succeeds her as owner of the Grand Budapest Hotel, and becomes one of the wealthiest Zubrowkans. He travels by train with the now-wed Zero and Agatha to celebrate, before encountering hostile soldiers that destroy Zero's refugee documents. Gustave tries to fend off the soldiers but is killed. Zero inherits his fortune and maintains the Grand Budapest in memory of Agatha, who died of flu with their infant son.

The experiences are later fictionalised and incorporated into the Author's novel The Grand Budapest Hotel.

Cast
 Ralph Fiennes as Monsieur Gustave H., the Grand Budapest Hotel's renowned concierge
 Tony Revolori as Zero Moustafa, the newly hired bellhop mentored by Gustave
 F. Murray Abraham as the elderly Zero
 Adrien Brody as Dmitri, Madame D.'s son
 Willem Dafoe as J. G. Jopling, a ruthless hitman working for Dmitri
 Saoirse Ronan as Agatha, an apprentice baker and Zero's girlfriend
 Tilda Swinton as Madame D., the wealthy dowager and secret owner of the hotel
 Edward Norton as Albert Henckels, the police investigator of Madame's murder
 Mathieu Amalric as Serge X, a shifty butler who works for Madame
 Jeff Goldblum as Deputy Vilmos Kovacs, the lawyer representing Grand Budapest interests
 Harvey Keitel as Ludwig, leader of a prison gang at Checkpoint Nineteen
 Tom Wilkinson as Author, writer of The Grand Budapest Hotel
 Jude Law as the young Author in 1968
 Bill Murray as M. Ivan, Gustave's friend and one of several concierges affiliated with the Society of the Crossed Keys
 Jason Schwartzman as M. Jean, the Grand Budapest's concierge in 1968
 Léa Seydoux as Clotilde, maid at Schloss Lutz
 Owen Wilson as M. Chuck, a Society of the Crossed Keys concierge

Other cast members included Larry Pine as Mr. Mosher, Milton Welsh as Franz Müller, Giselda Volodi as Serge's sister, Wolfram Nielacny as Herr Becker, Florian Lukas as Pinky, Karl Markovics as Wolf, Volker Michalowski as Günther, Neal Huff as Lieutenant, Bob Balaban as M. Martin, Fisher Stevens as M. Robin, Wallace Wolodarsky as M. Georges, Waris Ahluwalia as M. Dino, Jella Niemann as the young woman, and Lucas Hedges as a pump attendant.

Production

Development

Drafting of The Grand Budapest Hotel story began in 2006, when Wes Anderson produced an 18-page script with longtime collaborator Hugo Guinness. They imagined a fragmented tale of a character inspired by a mutual friend, based in modern France and the United Kingdom. Though their prototype led to a roughly 12-minute-long cut, the Anderson–Guinness collaboration stalled when the two men were unable to coalesce a uniform sequence of events to advance their story. By this time, Anderson had begun researching the work of Austrian novelist Stefan Zweig, with which he was vaguely familiar. He became fascinated with Zweig, gravitating to Beware of Pity (1939), The World of Yesterday (1942), and The Post Office Girl (1982) for their fatalist mythos and Zweig's portrait of early twentieth-century Vienna. Anderson also used period images and urbane Europe-set mid-century Hollywood comedies as references. He ultimately pursued a historical pastiche with an alternate timeline, disillusioned with popular media's romanticism of pre-World War II European history. Once The Grand Budapest Hotel took definite form, Anderson resumed the scriptwriting, finishing the screenplay in six weeks. The producers tapped Jay Clarke to supervise production of the film's animatics, with voiceovers by Anderson.

Anderson's sightseeing in Europe was another source of inspiration for The Grand Budapest Hotel visual motifs. The writer-director visited Vienna, Munich, and other major cities before the project's conception, but most location scouting began after the Cannes premiere of his coming-of-age drama Moonrise Kingdom (2012). He and the producers toured Budapest, small Italian spa towns, and the Czech resort Karlovy Vary before a final stop in Germany, consulting hotel staff to develop an accurate idea of a real-life concierge's work.

Casting

A seventeen-actor ensemble received star billing in The Grand Budapest Hotel. Anderson customarily employs a troupe of longtime collaborators—Bill Murray, Adrien Brody, Edward Norton, Owen Wilson, Tilda Swinton, Harvey Keitel, Willem Dafoe, Jeff Goldblum, and Jason Schwartzman have worked on one or more of his projects. Norton and Murray immediately signed when sent the script. The Grand Budapest Hotel ensemble comprised mostly bit cameos. Because of the limitations of such roles, Brody said that the most significant challenge was balancing the film's comedy with the otherwise solemn subject matter. All were the filmmakers' first casting choices save for Swinton, whom they pursued for Madame D. when Angela Lansbury dropped out as a result of a prior commitment to a Driving Miss Daisy theater production. Once hired, actors were encouraged to study the source material to prepare. Dafoe and Fiennes in particular found the animatics helpful in conceptualizing The Grand Budapest Hotel from Anderson's perspective, though Fiennes did not refer to them too often because he wanted his acting to be spontaneous.

Anderson desired an English actor to play Gustave, and Fiennes was an actor he sought to work with for several years. Fiennes, surprised by the offer, was eager to depart from his famously villainous roles and found Gustave's panache compelling. Fiennes said he was initially unsure how to approach his character because the extent of Anderson's oversight meant actors could not improvise on set, constraining his usually instinctive performing style. The direction of Gustave's persona then became another question of tone, whether the portrayal be hyper-camp or understated. Fiennes drew on several sources to shape his character's persona, among them his triple role as Hungarian-Jewish men escaping fascist persecution in the István Szabó-directed drama Sunshine (1999), his brief stint as a young porter at Brown's Hotel in London, and the experience reading The World of Yesterday. Johnny Depp was reported as an early candidate in the press, claims which Anderson denied, despite later reports that scheduling conflicts had halted negotiations.

Casting director Douglas Aibel was responsible for hiring a suitable actor to play young Zero. Aibel's months-long search for prospective actors proved troublesome as he was unable to fulfill the specifications for an unknown teenage actor of Arabic descent. "We were just trying to leave no stone unturned in the process." Filmmakers held auditions in Egypt, Lebanon, Israel, France, England, and the United States before revising the role's ethnic criterion. Eventually the filmmakers narrowed their search to Tony Revolori and his older brother Mario, novices of Guatemalan descent, and Tony landed the part after one taped audition. He and Anderson rehearsed together for over four months before the start of filming to build a rapport. Abraham spent about a week on set filming his scenes as the elderly Zero.

Saoirse Ronan joined The Grand Budapest Hotel in November 2012. Though a longtime Anderson fan, Ronan feared the deadpan, theatrical acting style characteristic of Anderson-directed films would be too difficult to master. She was reassured by the writer-director's conviction, "He guides everyone extremely well. He is very secure in his vision and he is very comfortable with everything he does. He knows it is going to work." The decision to play Agatha with Ronan's native Irish accent was Anderson's idea, after experimenting with German, English, and American accents; they felt an Irish accent projected a warm, feisty spirit into Agatha.

Filming

The project was director of photography Robert Yeoman's eighth film with Anderson. Yeoman participated in an early scouting session with Anderson, recording footage with stand-in film crew to assess how certain scenes would unfold. Yeoman drew on Vittorio Storaro's dramatic lighting techniques in the romantic musical One From the Heart (1982). Filmmakers shot The Grand Budapest Hotel in ten weeks, from January to March 2013 in eastern Germany, where it qualified for a tax rebate financed by the German government's Federal Film Fund and Medienboard Berlin-Brandenburg. They also found Germany attractive because the production base was geographically confined, facilitating efficient logistics, but the frigid weather and reduced daylight of early winter disrupted the shooting schedule, compounded by the slow film stock used for the camerawork. To rectify the issue, the producers used artificial lighting, accelerated the daily work schedule, and filmed night scenes at dusk.

Principal photography took place at the Babelsberg Studio in suburban Berlin and in Görlitz, a mid-sized border town on the Lusatian Neisse on Germany's eastern frontier. The filmmakers staged their largest interior sets at the vacant twentieth-century Görlitzer Warenhaus, whose atrium doubled for the Grand Budapest Hotel lobby. The top two floors housed production offices and storage space for cameras and wardrobe. Anderson at one point considered buying the Warenhaus to save it from demolition. He and the producers eyed vacant buildings because they could exercise full artistic control, and scouting active hotels that often enforce heavy shooting restrictions would call into question The Grand Budapest Hotel integrity. Exterior shots of the eighteenth-century estate Hainewalde Manor and interior shots of Schloss Waldenburg stood in for the Schloss Lutz estate. Elsewhere in Saxony, production moved to Zwickau—shooting at the Osterstein Castle—and the state capital Dresden, where scenes were filmed at the Zwinger and the Pfunds Molkerei creamery.

Cinematography

Yeoman shot The Grand Budapest Hotel on 35 mm film using Kodak Vision3 200T 5213 film stock from a single Arricam Studio camera provided by Arri's Berlin office. His approach entailed the use of a Chapman-Leonard Hybrid III camera dolly for tracking shots and a geared head to achieve most of the film's rapid whip pans. For whip pans greater than 90 degrees, the filmmakers installed a fluid head from Mitchell Camera Corporation's OConnor Ultimate product line for greater fidelity. Anderson requested Yeoman and project key grip Sanjay Sami focus on new methods for shooting the scenes. Thus they used the Mad About Technology Towercam Twin Peek, a telescoping camera platform, to traverse between floors, sometimes in lieu of a camera crane. For example, when a lantern drops to the basement from a hole in the cell floor in the Checkpoint Nineteen jailbreak scene, the filmmakers suspended the towercam upside-down, a setup which allowed the camera to descend to the ground.

The Grand Budapest Hotel uses three aspect ratios as framing devices which streamline the film's story, evoking the aesthetic of the corresponding periods. The multifarious structure of The Grand Budapest Hotel emerged from Anderson's desire to shoot in 1.37:1 format, also known as Academy ratio. Production used Academy ratio for scenes set in 1932, which, according to Yeoman, provided the filmmakers with greater-than-routine headroom. He and the producers referred to the work of Ernst Lubitsch and other directors of the period to acclimate to the compositions produced from said format. Filmmakers formatted modern scenes in standard 1.85:1 ratio, and the 1968 scenes were captured in widescreen 2.40:1 ratio with Technovision Cooke anamorphic lenses. These lenses produced a certain texture, one that lacked the sharpness of Panavision's Primo anamorphic lenses.

Yeoman lit interior shots with tungsten incandescent fixtures and DMX-dimmer-controlled lighting. The crew made the Warenhaus ceiling from stretched muslin rigged with twenty 4K HMI lamps, an arrangement wherein the reflected light penetrated the skylight, accentuating the set's daylighting. Yeoman preferred the lighting choice because the warm tungsten fixtures contrasted with the coolish daylight. When shooting deliberately less inviting hotel sets, such as Zero and Gustave's small bedrooms and the Grand Budapest's servants' quarters, the filmmakers combined fluorescent lighting, paper lanterns, and bare incandescent lights for historical accuracy.

The Stuttgart-based LUXX Studios and Look Effects' German branch (also in Stuttgart) managed most of The Grand Budapest Hotel visual effects, under the supervision of Gabriel Sanchez. Their work for the film comprised 300 shots, created by a small cadre of specialized artists. The development of the film's effects was swift, but at times difficult. Sanchez did not work on set with Anderson as Look Effects opened their Stuttgart headquarters after The Grand Budapest Hotel filming wrapped, and therefore was only able to reference his prior experience with the director. The California-based artist also became homesick working his first international assignment. Only four artists from the newly assembled team had experience working on a multi-million dollar studio set.

Creation of the effects was daunting because of their technical demands. The filmmakers camouflaged some of the stop-motion and matte effects in the forest-set chase scene to convey the desired intensity, and enhancing the snowscape with particle effects posed another challenge. Sanchez cites the observatory and hotel shots as work that best demonstrate his special effects team's ingenuity. To achieve the aging brutalist design of the 1968 Grand Budapest, they generated computer models supplemented with detailed lighting, matte effects and shadowy expanses. The crew used a similar technique in developing digital shots of the observatory; unlike the hotel, the observatory's base miniature was presented in pieces. They rendered the observatory with 20 different elements, data furthermore enhanced at Anderson's request. It took about one hour per shot to complete the final digital rendering.

Set design

Adam Stockhausen—another Anderson associate—was responsible for The Grand Budapest Hotel production design. He and Anderson collaborated previously on The Darjeeling Limited (2007) and Moonrise Kingdom. Stockhausen researched the United States Library of Congress's photochrom print collection of alpine resorts to source ideas for the film's visual palette. These images showcased little of recognizable Europe, instead cataloging obscure historical landmarks unknown to the general public. The resulting stylistic choice is a warm, bright visual palette pronounced by soft pastel tonalities. Some of The Grand Budapest Hotel interior sets contrast this look in interior shots, primarily Schloss Lutz and the Checkpoint Nineteen prison: the imposing hardwoods, intense greens and golds of the Schloss Lutz evoke oppressive wealth, and the derelict Checkpoint Nineteen decays in a cool bluish-gray tint.

The filmmakers relied on matte paintings and miniature effect techniques to play on perspective for elaborate scenes, creating the illusion of size and grandeur. Under the leadership of Simon Weisse, scale models of structures were constructed by a Berlin-based propmaking team at Studio Babelsberg in tandem with the Görlitz shoot. Weisse joined The Grand Budapest Hotel design staff after coming to the attention of production manager Miki Emmrich, with whom he worked on Cloud Atlas (2012). Anderson liked the novelty of miniatures, having used them in The Life Aquatic with Steve Zissou (2004) and more extensively in Fantastic Mr. Fox (2009).

Weisse and his propmakers built three major miniature models: the -scale forest set, the -scale observatory, and the -scale Grand Budapest Hotel set, based on art director Carl Sprague's conceptual renderings. The Grand Budapest Hotel set comprised the hotel building atop a wooded ledge with a funicular, bound by a Friedrichian landscape painting superimposed with green-screen technology. Designers sculpted the 3-meter-high (9.8 ft) hotel with silicone resin molds and etched brass embellishment. Photos of the Warenhaus set were then glued in boxes installed to each window to convey the illusion of light. The funicular's 35-degree slope required a separate, lateral model. Timber, soldered brass, fine powdered sugar, and styrofoam were used to construct the observatory set, and polyester fiberfill was the forest model's snow.

The creation of Boy with Apple was a four-month-long process by English painter Michael Taylor, who was inspired by Renaissance portraiture. Taylor had been approached by one of the producers before receiving the script and source material, and the film's artistic direction piqued his interest. The painter originally worked alone before deferring to Anderson for input when certain aspects of the painting did not match the writer-director's vision. Taylor found the initial process difficult, struggling to be true to Boy with Apple eclectic sources. He said that while he had been unfamiliar with Anderson's work, that unfamiliarity enabled him to imbue the painting with a unique identity. The producers' casting choice for Boy with Apple subject was contingent on the character description of a blond-haired boy with the slender, athletic frame of a ballet dancer. They signed Ed Munro, an actor with a theater background, the day after his audition. The filmmakers staged the painting sessions at a Jacobean boarding school, then empty for summer holiday, near Taylor's home in Dorset. Filmmakers dressed Munro in about 50 ornate costumes with velvet cloaks, codpieces and furs, photographed each one, and submitted them to Anderson for approval. Munro, who maintained the same posture and facial expression for several hours, found the costuming uncomfortable.

Ann Atkins was The Grand Budapest Hotel lead graphic designer. She devised Zubrowkan objects—newspapers, banknotes, police reports and passports—from reference material gathered from the location scouting. Atkins was a novice in film but had valuable expertise in advertising design to reference, producing 20 sketches of a single artifact per day when the on-set shooting peaked. She used an antique typewriter for the mock documents with a dip pen for the embellished handwriting. Among her early tasks was the creation of weathered, worn props for fidelity to the film's timeline. To achieve the appearance of prolonged exposure to air, Atkins blow dried paper dipped in tea. She said, "The beautiful thing about period filmmaking is that you’re creating graphic design for a time before graphic designers existed, per se. It was really the craftsmen who were the designers: the blacksmith designed the lettering in the cast iron gates; the glazier sculpted the lettering in the stained glass; the sign-painter drew the lettering for the shopfronts; the printer chose the type blocks for the stationery."

Pastries are an important motif in The Grand Budapest Hotel story. The signature courtesan au chocolat from Mendl's mirrors the French dessert religieuse, a choux-based pastry with a mocha (or chocolate) glaze and vanilla custard filling. A Görlitz pastry chef crafted the courtesan before working with Anderson on the final design.

Costumes

Veteran costume designer Milena Canonero endeavored to capture the essence of the film's characters. Canonero researched 1930s uniform design and period artwork by photographers George Hurrell and Man Ray and painters Kees van Dongen, Gustav Klimt, George Grosz and Tamara de Lempicka. Canonero was also influenced by non-period literature and art. Specialized artists then realized her designs in Photoshop, allowing them to work closely to the actors' likenesses. The filmmakers assembled most of the basic costumes in their Görlitz workshop, others from the Berlin-based Theaterkunst, and the uniforms came from a Polish workshop. They rented vintagewear for extras in crowd shots. Canonero used dense mauve and deep-purple AW Hainsworth facecloth for the Grand Budapest uniforms instead of the more subdued colors typical of hospitality uniforms. She researched diverse ideas for the gray-and-black military uniforms, in accordance with script specifications that they not be green or too historically identifiable. Anderson did most of the insignia, occasionally approving designs from Canonero's workshop in Rome.

The filmmakers gave the characters distinct looks. They distinguished men with facial hair to augment their dapper style. Gustave's wardrobe was intended to evoke "a sense of perfection and control" even in his collapsing livelihood. Anderson and Canonero visualized Agatha with a Mexico-shaped facial birthmark and a wheat blade in her hair, costumed to reflect her working-class stature and the brightness of her pastries. Madame was dressed in a silk velvet coat-and-gown-ensemble with Klimtesque handprint patterns and mink trim by Fendi, from a previous professional relationship with Anderson and Canonero. Fendi developed the gray astrakhan fur overcoat for Norton's Albert, and loaned other furs to assist the needs of the shoot. To age Swinton, makeup artist Mark Coulier applied soft silicone rubber prosthetics encapsulated in dissolvable plastic molding on her face. Dafoe's Jopling wore a Prada leather coat inspired by outerwear for military dispatch riders, adorned with custom silver knuckle pieces from jeweler Waris Ahluwalia (a close friend of Anderson's). Canonero modified the coat with fine red-wool stitching and a weapons compartment inside the front lapel.

Music

Anderson recruited Alexandre Desplat to compose the film's Russian folk-influenced score encompassing symphonic compositions and background drones; the balalaika formed the score's musical core. The instrument gave Anderson and music supervisor Randall Poster a chance to immerse themselves in an unfamiliar genre, and they spent about six months consulting experts to hone their vision. Its score's classical roots make The Grand Budapest Hotel unique among Anderson-directed projects, forgoing the writer-director's usual practice of employing a selection of contemporary pop music. Desplat felt his exposure to Anderson's idiosyncratic filmmaking style was integral to articulating an Eastern European musical approach for the film's score. His direction expanded on some of the sounds and instrumentation of Fantastic Mr. Fox and Moonrise Kingdom. As well, the scope of Desplat's responsibilities entailed differentiating The Grand Budapest Hotel sprawling cast of characters with distinctive melodic themes and motifs. ABKCO Records released the 32-track score digitally on March 4, 2014. It featured sampled recordings and contributions from orchestras such as the Osipov State Russian Folk Orchestra and a 50-person ensemble of French and Russian balalaika players.

Themes and style

The reticent Anderson did not discuss themes in interviews conducted during the press junkets, lending several interpretations of The Grand Budapest Hotel. Studies cite intertwining messages of tragedy, war, fascism, and nostalgia as the film's thematic center.

Nostalgia and fascism

Nostalgia is a major theme in Anderson's repertoire. The Grand Budapest Hotel universe is envisioned with nostalgic yearning, where characters perpetuate the "illusion of a time where they don't belong", the consequence of not so much the recapture of a vanished era than a romanticizing of the past. One theory among critics suggests "profound" subtext of the science of human memory within the film's nonlinear narrative structure, whereas others saw The Grand Budapest Hotel as an introspection of Anderson's sensibilities both as a writer and as a director. According to the academic Donna Kornhaber, The Grand Budapest Hotel reinforces the increasingly dark subtext of collectivism defining late period Anderson films.

The Grand Budapest Hotel does not directly refer to historical events, rather oblique references contextualize the real time history. The most deliberate of these references allude specifically to Nazism. In perhaps the film's most dramatic display of corrupt power, the Zubrowkan military invasion of the Grand Budapest, and the fascist emblems of the hotel lobby's newly adorned tapestry, mirror scenes from Leni Riefenstahl's propaganda film Triumph of the Will (1935). Gustave's black-and-white stripes evoke the uniforms of the concentration camp prisoners, and his steadfast commitment to his job becomes an act of defiance that threatens to jeopardize his life. The Atlantic Norman L. Eisen, who is among the people listed in "Special Thanks" at the end of the film, called The Grand Budapest Hotel a cautionary tale of the consequences of the Holocaust, a story that examines Nazi motivations while traversing postwar European history through comedy. He contends that certain main characters symbolize both the oppressed—the openly bisexual Gustave represents the LGBT community, the refugee Zero represents nonwhite immigrants, and Kovacs represents ethnic Jews—and the oppressor in Dmitri, overseer of a fascist, SS-like organization. Film critic Daniel Garrett argues Gustave defies fascist notions of human perfection because he embraces the flaws of his peers, despite his own expertise: "Gustave is not surprised by feelings of anxiety or desire, or contemptuous of a scarred or crippled body; and he shares his values with his staff, with Zero. Gustave sees the heart and the effort, the spirit, despite his regard for excellence, ritual, and style."

Friendship and loyalty
Another principal topic of discussion among critics has been The Grand Budapest Hotel exploration of friendship and loyalty. Indeed, Zero appears to be Gustave's only true friend, and his unwavering devotion (at first, a mentor-protégé relationship) establishes the film's strongest bond. Gustave is underwhelmed by Zero but is increasingly empathetic to his newly hired mentee's plight in their subsequent exploits, united by their shared enthusiasm for the hotel—so much that he defends Zero against police thuggery and rewards his loyalty with his inheritance. Zero's less-central romance with Agatha is as constant a presence as his friendship with Gustave; he continues operating the hotel in his dead lover's memory, despite the slain Gustave representing the Grand Budapest's spirit. The subject matter's emphasis of love, friendship, and the intertwining tales of nobility, dignity, and self-control, The New Yorker Richard Brody argues, forms the "very soul of a moral politics that transcends accidents of circumstance and particular historical incidents".

Kornhaber contends the focus on the dynamic of a mismatched pairing forms the crux of The Grand Budapest Hotel central theme. The unusual circumstance of the Gustave–Zero friendship seems to reflect an attachment to "an idea of historical and cultural belonging that they find ultimately to be best expressed through one another", and by proxy, the two men discover a fundamental kinship through their shared esteem of the Grand Budapest.

Color

The Grand Budapest Hotel use of color accentuates narrative tones and conveys visual emphasis to the subject matter and passage of time. The film eschews Anderson's trademark pale yellow for a sharp palette of vibrant reds, pinks and purples in prewar Grand Budapest scenes. The composition fades as the timeline forebodes impending war, sometimes in complete black-and-white in scenes exploring Zero's memory of wartime, underscoring the gradual tonal shift. Subdued beiges, orange, and pale blue characterize the visual palette of postwar Grand Budapest scenes, manifesting the hotel's diminished prestige.

Marketing and release

The Grand Budapest Hotel premiered in competition at the 64th Berlin International Film Festival on February 6, 2014, winning the fest's Silver Bear Grand Jury Prize. The film was Anderson's third in competition at the festival. It headlined the 10th Glasgow Film Festival as the event's opening film, held February 20 – March 2, 2014, before hosting its North American premiere on February 27 at the Film at Lincoln Center in New York City.

Fox Searchlight spearheaded the marketing campaign. Their strategy involved merchandise releases, a global publicity tour, the creation of mock websites about Zubrowkan culture, and trailers highlighting the cast's star power. One of their most significant marketing tactics, instructional videos detailing the creation of desserts mirroring Mendl's baked goods, used fan footage submitted to the producers for TV-commercial spots on cooking networks. In conjunction with their collaboration with Anderson, Prada showcased its capsule collection of custom luggage from in-store displays at the Berlin flagship store.

The Grand Budapest Hotel was released in France on February 26, 2014, preceding the film's global rollout. General release expanded to Germany, Belgium, the United Kingdom, the United States (March 7), and two other international markets the second week. The Grand Budapest Hotel opened to a few US theaters as part of a month-long limited platform release, initially screening from four arthouse theaters in New York and Los Angeles. After the 87th Academy Awards' nominations announcement, Fox re-expanded the film's theater presence for a brief, multi-city re-release campaign.

Fox Searchlight released The Grand Budapest Hotel on DVD and Blu-ray on June 17, 2014. The discs include behind-the-scenes footage with Murray, promotional shots, deleted scenes, and the theatrical trailer. The Grand Budapest Hotel was the fourth-best selling film on DVD and Blu-ray in its first week of US sales, selling 92,196 copies and earning US$1.6 million. By March 2015, the film had sold 551,639 copies.

The Criterion Collection issued director-approved special edition Blu-ray and DVD releases of The Grand Budapest Hotel on April 28, 2020. The discs include audio commentary from Anderson, Goldblum, producer Roman Coppola, and film critic Kent Jones; storyboard animatics, a behind-the-scenes documentary, video essays, and previously unaired cast and crew interviews.

Reception

Box office

The Grand Budapest Hotel was considered a surprise box office success. The film's performance plateaued in North America after a strong start, but finished the theatrical run as Anderson's highest-grossing film in the region. It performed strongest in key European and Asian markets. Germany was the most lucrative market, and the film's link to that country boosted the box office performance. South Korea, Australia, Spain, France, and the United Kingdom represented some of the film's largest takings. The Grand Budapest Hotel earned $59.3 million (34.3 percent of its earnings) in the United States and Canada and $113.7 million (65.7 percent) overseas, for a worldwide total of $173 million, making it the 46th-highest-grossing film of 2014, and Anderson's highest-grossing film to date.

The film posted $2.8 million from 172 theaters during its opening week in France, trailing Supercondriaque and Non-Stop. In Paris, The Grand Budapest Hotel screenings were the weekend's biggest numbers. The film's $16,220 per-theater average was the best opening for any Anderson-directed project in France to date. In its second week the number of theaters grew to 192, and The Grand Budapest Hotel grossed another $1.64 million at the French box office. Earnings dropped by just 30 percent the following weekend, for a total gross of $1.1 million. By March 24, the box office posted a five percent increase, and The Grand Budapest Hotel French release had taken $8.2 million overall.

The week of March 6 saw The Grand Budapest Hotel take $6.2 million from 727 theaters internationally, yielding the most robust figures in Belgium ($156,000, from 12 theaters), Austria ($162,000, from 29 theaters), Germany ($1.138 million, from 163 theaters), and the United Kingdom (top-three debut, with £1.53 million or $1.85 million from 284 theaters). It increased 11 percent in Germany the following weekend to $1.1 million, and The Grand Budapest Hotel yielded $5.2 million from German cinemas by the week of March 31. It sustained the box office momentum into the second week of UK general release with improved sales from an expanded theater presence, and by the third week, the film topped the national top ten with £1.27 million ($1.55 million) from 458 screens, buoyed by positive reviews in the media. After a month it had earned $13.2 million in the UK. The Grand Budapest Hotel expansion to other overseas markets continued toward the end of March, marked by significant releases in Sweden (first place, with $498,108), Spain (third, with $1 million), and South Korea (the country's biggest specialty film opening ever, with $622,109 from 162 cinemas). During its second week of release in South Korea, the film's box office ballooned by 70 percent to $996,000. On its opening week elsewhere, The Grand Budapest Hotel earned $1.8 million in Australia, $382,000 in Brazil, and $1 million in Italy. By May 27, the film's international gross exceeded $100 million.

In the United States, The Grand Budapest Hotel opened to a $202,792-per theater average from a four-theater $811,166 overall gross, breaking the record for most robust live-action limited release previously held by Paul Thomas Anderson's The Master (2012). The return, exceeding Fox's expectations for the weekend, was the best US opening for an Anderson-directed project to date. The Grand Budapest Hotel also eclipsed Moonrise Kingdom $130,749 per-theater average, hitherto Anderson's highest-opening limited release. Fading interest in films hoping to capitalize on Academy Awards prestige and its crossover appeal to younger, casual moviegoers were crucial to The Grand Budapest Hotel early box office success. The film sustained the box office momentum as large suburban cineplexes were added to its limited run, racking $3.6 million the second week and $6.7 million the following weekend. The film officially entered wide release the week of March 30 by screening in 977 theaters across North America. New York, Los Angeles, San Francisco, Toronto, Washington, and Montreal were The Grand Budapest Hotel most successful North American cities. Its theater count peaked at 1,467 in mid-April before a gradual decline. By the end of the month, the film's domestic gross topped $50 million. The Grand Budapest Hotel ended its North American run on February 26, 2015.

Critical response

The Grand Budapest Hotel received critical acclaim and various critics selected the film in their end-of-2014 lists. It appeared on professional rankings from BBC and IndieWire, based on retrospective appraisal, as one of the greatest films of the twenty-first century. Many of the reviews complimented The Grand Budapest Hotel for its craftsmanship, often singling out the film's zany sensibility and Anderson's expertise for further praise, the latter for the creation of a fanciful onscreen world which does not take itself too seriously. Occasionally The Grand Budapest Hotel drew criticism for evading some of the harsh realities of the subject matter; according to a Vanity Fair reviewer, the film's devotion to a "kitschy adventure story that feels curiously weightless, at times even arbitrary" undermined any thoughtful moral. The comic treatment of a madcap adventure was cited among the strengths of the film, though sometimes the fragmented storytelling approach was considered a flaw by some critics, such as The New Yorker David Denby, for following a sequence of events that seemed to lack emotional continuity.

The actors' performances were routinely mentioned in the reviews. Journalists felt the ensemble brought The Grand Budapest Hotel ethos to life in comedic and dramatic moments, particularly Ralph Fiennes, whose performance was called "transformative" and "total perfection". San Francisco Chronicle Mick LaSalle felt Fiennes's casting was the study of a reserved actor exhibiting the fullest extent of his emotional range, and Los Angeles Times Kenneth Turan believed he exuded an "unbounded but carefully calibrated zeal", the only such actor capable of realizing Anderson's vision of a "will-o'-the-wisp world heft and reality while still being faithful to the singular spirit that underlies it". On the other hand, characterization in The Grand Budapest Hotel drew varying responses from reviewers; Gustave, for example, was described as a man "of convincing feelings", "sweetly wistful", but a protagonist lacking the depth of other prolific heroes in the Anderson canon, emblematic of a film that doesn't quite appear to fully flesh out the core cast of characters.

Its critical consensus reads, "Typically stylish but deceptively thoughtful, The Grand Budapest Hotel finds Wes Anderson once again using ornate visual environments to explore deeply emotional ideas." Metacritic (which uses a weighted average) assigned The Grand Budapest Hotel a score of 88 out of 100 based on 48 critics, indicating "universal acclaim".

Accolades

The Grand Budapest Hotel was not an immediate favorite to dominate the 87th Academy Awards season. The film's early March opening was thought to deter any chance of Oscar recognition, since the usual industry practice to better position feature films for awards attention is to schedule a fall release. The last spring season releases to achieve Best Picture success until then were Erin Brockovich (2000) and The Silence of the Lambs (1991). As the Academy Award nominations approached, a frontrunner had not emerged, partly as a result of a critical backlash against the season's biggest contenders, such as American Sniper, Selma and The Imitation Game. But US critics spread their honors for The Grand Budapest Hotel when compiling their end-of-year lists, and the film soon gained momentum thanks to a significant presence in the award circuit. Fox Searchlight president Nancy Utley attributed the film's ascendancy to its months-long presence on multi-media home entertainment platforms, which provided greater viewing opportunity for Academy voters. At the Academy Award season, the film received nominations for Best Picture, Best Director (tied with Birdman), Best Original Screenplay, Best Cinematography, and Best Film Editing; and won Best Original Score, Best Production Design, Best Makeup and Hairstyling, and Best Costume Design.

The Grand Budapest Hotel was a candidate for other awards for excellence in writing, acting, directing, and technical achievement. It received nominations such as the Screen Actors Guild Award for Outstanding Performance by a Cast in a Motion Picture and the César Award for Best Foreign Film. The film's other wins include three Critics' Choice Movie Awards, five British Academy Film Awards, and a Golden Globe in the category of Best Motion Picture—Musical or Comedy.

Notes

References

Bibliography

External links

 
 
 
 

2014 black comedy films
2014 films
2010s adventure comedy films
2010s crime comedy films
2010s English-language films
American adventure comedy films
American black comedy films
American crime comedy films
American nonlinear narrative films
Babelsberg Studio films
BAFTA winners (films)
Best Musical or Comedy Picture Golden Globe winners
English-language German films
German adventure comedy films
German black comedy films
German crime comedy films
Golden Eagle Award (Russia) for Best Foreign Language Film winners
Films about friendship
Films about inheritances
Films about murder
Films based on multiple works
Films directed by Wes Anderson
Films produced by Scott Rudin
Films produced by Wes Anderson
Films set in 1932
Films set in 1968
Films set in 1985
Films set in 2014
Films set in a fictional country
Films set in Europe
Films set in hotels
Films set in prison
Films shot in Germany
Films shot in Kraków
Films that won the Academy Award for Best Makeup
Films that won the Best Costume Design Academy Award
Films that won the Best Original Score Academy Award
Films whose art director won the Best Art Direction Academy Award
Films whose writer won the Best Original Screenplay BAFTA Award
Films scored by Alexandre Desplat
Films with screenplays by Wes Anderson
Fox Searchlight Pictures films
Indian Paintbrush (production company) films
TSG Entertainment films
Rail transport films
Silver Bear Grand Jury Prize winners
2010s American films
2010s German films
Male bisexuality in film